Aleksey Anatolyevich Averyanov (born 28 May 1986) is a Russian former professional football player. Averyanov played striker and midfielder positions.

Club career
He played 4 seasons in the Russian Football National League for PFC Spartak Nalchik, FC Luch-Energiya Vladivostok and FC Tambov.

External links
 
 

1985 births
Footballers from Moscow
Living people
Russian footballers
Association football midfielders
PFC Spartak Nalchik players
FC Luch Vladivostok players
FC Tambov players